A. Nesamony, sometimes known as Marshal Nesamony, was a political leader from Kanyakumari district in Tamil Nadu, India. He was the second son of Kesavan Appavu Nadar, born on 12 June 1895 at Nesarpuram, Palliyadi  in Vilavancode Taluk, Kanyakumari district. He graduated from Maharaja's College in Thiruvananthapuram, and studied at law college in Thiruvananthapuram. He began practising in 1921. He was among those involved with the merger of four Taluks from Southern Travancore to Tamil Nadu.

Early life
He was educated at Scott Christian High School and then at C.M.S. College in Tirunelveli. While studying at C.M.S. College, he was elected as students' leader, which provided him with an opportunity to attend the Congress Conference at Calcutta. Influenced by Mahatma Gandhi at that time, he chose to wear only Khadi cotton dresses throughout his life. He graduated with a BA degree from Maharaja's College, Trivandrum, after which he began teaching, spending a year at Kurnool Bishop Heeber High school. He later became headmaster at Salvation Army Middle School in Trivandrum. Simultaneously he pursued his law studies at Government Law College, Thiruvananthapuram. He married  M. Caroline on 1 September 1914. He had one son and six daughters.

Legal practice
Nesamony registered as a lawyer at Nagercoil Sessions Court in 1921. He became a criminal lawyer at Nagercoil Bar. He was elected as the president of Nagercoil Lawyers' Association in 1943. In the same year he was also elected as the chairman of Nagercoil Municipal Council. Shri Nesamony is a distinguished lawyer. As he was a reputed lawyer, many young advocates irrespective of caste or religion wished to become his juniors. They gained much from him and later contributed to society as lawyers and politicians. A few among them were Chidambaranathan Nadar, Ponnappan Nadar, Gopalakrishnan, Fakrudeen Adam, and Razak. The TTNC president Sam Nathaniel was also his junior.

Public life
 1941-1942  Advocate; Member, Travancore Bar Council 
 Senate, Travancore University 
 1943-1947: Chairman of Nagercoil Municipality 
 1943 President, Nagercoil Bar Association 
 1945-1947: Member of Travancore Legislative (Thirumoolam) Assembly and nominated member to the Senate of the Travancore University  
 1948- 1952: Member of Travancore - Cochin Legislative Assembly   
 October 1947: Launched TTNC as a political party
 1943-1947 Member  Travancore Legislative Assembly  
 1948-1952: Member of Travancore-Cochin Constituent Assembly & leader of TTNC parliamentary party in assembly
 1952-1957: President of Travancore, Tamilnadu Congress Party
 1952-1957: Member of Parliament, Nagercoil Constituency 
 1957-1959: President,  District Congress Committee, 
 1957-1962: Member of Tamil Nadu Legislative Assembly  
 1962-1968: Member of Parliament, Nagercoil Constituency

Role in Diocese
1933 - 1947 	: 	Secretary, Travancore & Mission Church Councils 
1934 - 1942 	: 	South District Pastorate Council
1947 - 1960 	: 	Vice President - South Travancore Diocesan Council, C.S.I
1960 - 1968 	: 	Vice President - Kanyakumari Diocesan Council, C.S.I

Political career
He was a Member of Parliament elected from Tamil Nadu. He was elected to the Lok Sabha from Nagercoil constituency as an Indian National Congress candidate in 1951, 1962 and 1967 elections.

He was also a Member of the Legislative Assembly. He was elected to the Tamil Nadu legislative assembly as an Indian National Congress candidate from Killiyur constituency in 1957 election.

Kanyakumari district merger with Tamil Nadu

Background
Feudalism prevailed in the erstwhile state of Travancore. The jenmi system protected the socioeconomic and political status of the upper castes only, while the lower castes were exploited in many ways. Events such as the Upper Cloth Controversy and the Temple Entry Proclamation were reactions to this.

Events

A consequence of the social oppression and political repression was an ongoing campaign for recognition by the affected groups during the later nineteenth- and early twentieth-centuries. This was evidenced by, for example. the creation of the Nair Service Society and the SNDP.

The agitation intensified after Indian independence. A campaign was launched under the auspices of a political movement called the Travancore Tamil Nadu Congress (TTNC), to fight against the social ills that existed in the former state of Travancore. The TTNC later converted into a political party in order to contest elections. Suffered imprisonment at the hands of the P.S.P Government of the TC State during the agitation for the Merger of Travancore Tamil Area with the Madras State  It culminated in the formation of Kanyakumari district and its subsequent merger with Tamil Nadu on 1 November 1956 during the linguistic reorganisation of states.

Immediately thereafter, the TTNC merged with the Indian National Congress and became fully integrated with the national mainstream.
Shri Nesamany worked for the return of Kanyakumari to Tamil Nadu. He was known as a great champion, of the Tamil language and Tamilians.
He was a good public worker.

Founder, Nagercoil Municipal Destitute Home   
Chairman, Municipal Council Nagercoil   
Member T.C Town And Country Planning Association   
President Nagercoil Bar Association    
Member T.C Tuberculosis Association   
President Village Uplift Committee Nattalam- Vilavancode   
Member Medical Board College council and the Education Board of the South Travancore Diocesan Council   
Convener degree College Committee Nagercoil

Publications
Inside Travancore, Tamil Nadu   
Rule of Steel and Fire in Travancore Cochin 
Printed and Published Tamil Weekly " Thingal"

Recreation and Hobby
Tennis and cards-play 
Cinema 
Gardening and reading

Special interest
Study of Law

Death and legacy

Nesamony died on 1 June 1968 while serving as a member in the Lok Sabha. This caused a by-election in his Nagercoil constituency in 1969, which was won by Kamaraj.

Shri Nesamony, who had been a Member of this House, has been a relentless fighter and a doughty champion of the rights of minorities
and the establishment of those riihu. He has been considered as a deliverer by the people of Kanyakumari District The affectionate and loyal people of Kanyakumari District called him as 'Raja Nesamony': He has been held in high esteem for his sincerity, Impeccable honesty and integrity. He was a man who fought heroically and saw the realisation of the rosy dream of the people of Kanyakumari District namely, the merger of Kanyakumari District with Tamil Nadu. In order to achieve his goal, he had to fight with his political bosses and though  ultimately they might claim that they had succeeded, the fact remains that he had conquered every thing he wanted. Till his death, his spirit was undying and he was clear in his concept. Whenever Marshall Nesamony fought against forces, terrible and with alarming dimensions, he used to
say, let the trail sparrow hurt itself against the eagle.

There have been various tributes paid to his memory since that time. These include:
the establishment of Nesamony Memorial Christian College at Marthandam
the erection of a statue near Anna bus-stand in the heart of Nagercoil, together with a memorial building
the creation of a satellite township called Nesamony Nagar on the outskirts of Nagercoil, where the headquarters of the former Nesamony Transport Corporation (a Tamil Nadu government undertaking) existed
the naming of the bridge built across the Kuzhithurai river as Nesamony Paalam
his birthplace in Palliyadi was named Nesarpuram.
a park near Thingalnagar-Monday Market Bus-stand in Kanyakumari district was named  Nesamony Poonga
 The central government published commemorative postal envelopes in recognition of the centenary of his birth in 1995.
Tamil Nadu government opened a  memorial on 27 February 2014 at Nagercoil

Further reading

References

Indian National Congress politicians from Tamil Nadu
1968 deaths
1895 births
India MPs 1952–1957
India MPs 1962–1967
India MPs 1967–1970
Lok Sabha members from Tamil Nadu
People from Kanyakumari district